Holme is the site of a lost settlement in West Lindsey, Lincolnshire, England.

Holme was documented as a village in 1334, but no trace remains today. Holme was in the Lawress Wapentake.

References

External links 

West Lindsey District
Deserted medieval villages in Lincolnshire